The January 2010 North American winter storms were a group of seven powerful winter storms that affected Canada and the Contiguous United States, particularly California. The storms developed from the combination of a strong El Niño episode, a powerful jet stream, and an atmospheric river that opened from the West Pacific Ocean into the Western Seaboard. The storms shattered multiple records across the Western United States, with the sixth storm breaking records for the lowest recorded air pressure in multiple parts of California, which was also the most powerful winter storm to strike the Southwestern United States in 140 years. The fourth, fifth, and sixth storms spawned several tornadoes across California, with at least 6 tornadoes confirmed in California (including two EF1 tornadoes); the storms also spawned multiple waterspouts off the coast of California. The storms dumped record amounts of rain and snow in the Western United States, and also brought hurricane-force winds to the U.S. West Coast, causing flooding and wind damage, as well as triggering blackouts across California that cut the power to more than 1.3 million customers. The storms killed at least 10 people, and caused more than $66.879 million (2010 USD) in damages.

Meteorological History
From January 14 to 15, 2010, six extratropical disturbances developed over the north Pacific, within a large trough of low pressure, from the waters south of the Aleutian Islands to the east coast of Japan. Strengthened by an atmospheric river, a powerful jet stream with winds reaching , and the most powerful El Niño event (the fourth-strongest one on record) since 1997–98, the storms quickly developed while accelerating eastward. On the afternoon of January 16, the first storm reached the Pacific Northwest. On the same day, a seventh, small cyclone developed to the northwest of the first storm, which looped northwestward into the Gulf of Alaska for a few days, before dissipating on January 19. The first storm moved ashore British Columbia on the afternoon of January 17, impacting the Pacific Northwest, before dissipating early on the next day, ending the first wave of storms. 

On the afternoon of January 17, the second storm, the first of five powerful storms to impact California, reached the West Coast of the United States, beginning a week of heavy rainfall and powerful gale-force winds. The storm was steered northeastward by a blocking ridge of high pressure over the Central United States, and made landfall on British Columbia on January 18, before dissipating late that day. PST) that day. Afterward, the third storm weakened and stalled of the coast of the Pacific Northwest while the fourth storm approached, which reached the U.S. West Coast on January 19. The fourth storm began a small tornado outbreak in California on January 19, which would last until January 21, and the fourth storm also spawned four waterspouts off the coast of Southern California. On the afternoon of January 19, the National Weather Service issued two tornado warnings for San Diego County within hours of each other. The third storm absorbed the fourth storm on January 20, restrengthening somewhat in the process. The third storm then moved into the Gulf of Alaska for another few days, before dissipating on January 23.

On January 20, the fifth storm, the fourth storm to affect California, reached the West Coast of the U.S., beginning the third and final wave of storms. The fifth storm then moved northward and weakened, stalling over the northeast Pacific for another several days, before being absorbed into another approaching extratropical cyclone late on January 24.

On January 21, the sixth storm (the fifth and final storm to affect California) reached the West Coast of the U.S. The storm rapidly intensified as it approached California, reaching a peak intensity of  that afternoon, just prior to making landfall on California near San Francisco. This made the storm the most powerful winter storm to strike the Southwestern United States in 140 years. The storm also tapped into the Pineapple Express, boosting the amount of moisture in the storm. The storm broke low pressure records across California and Oregon as it moved inland, with a minimum pressure of  recorded in Eureka, California, and a minimum pressure of  recorded in San Diego County. The storm also produced an EF0 tornado in Ventura, California, as well as numerous waterspouts across Southern California. The powerful winter storm weakened as it moved inland, but continued to affect California until January 23. The ridge of high pressure previously stationed over the Central U.S. had broken down by then, allowing the powerful storm to move eastward across the mainland United States, with the storm expanding in size as it moved eastward. The sixth storm reached the Eastern United States on January 24, bringing rain and snow to the region. Over the next couple of days, the storm moved northeastward into Eastern Canada, becoming elongated during that time, with the southern part of the storm splitting off into a new winter storm. On January 27, the storm moved into the northern Hudson Bay and stalled, while gradually weakening. On January 28, the sixth storm was absorbed into another frontal storm approaching from the southwest.

Impact

California
From Sunday, January 17 to Saturday, January 23, 2010, a series of five very powerful winter storms bore down on Southern California, before moving eastward on January 22. On January 18, 23,000 customers in Southern California lost power for a short time, due to the flooding caused by one of the storms. On January 19, a woman was killed by a tree that fell on her home. On January 19, the fourth storm impacted Southern California, bringing flooding and powerful winds to Santee in San Diego County. On the afternoon of January 19, the National Weather Service issued two tornado warnings for San Diego County within hours of each other, as potentially tornadic thunderstorms crossed the area.

As the fifth and second-strongest of the week's storms (impact-wise) slammed into California on January 20, officials predicted as much as four feet (1.2 meters) of snow would fall in Northern California. On the morning of January 20, more than 500 homes were evacuated as floods struck multiple regions in California, as up to 6 inches (15 centimeters) of rain fell in the storms that had impacted the state by that point. Rescue and flood prevention services soon brought the situation under control, but one man was killed when a tree fell onto his house. By then, flooding up to a feet deep had occurred in multiple areas, with Flash Flood Warnings remaining in effect for much of California. A sinkhole also opened up at an intersection in Ventura, which was expected to take days to fill in. Two horses also died after being hit by lighting in a Santa Barbara field. Rare tornado warnings were issued in parts of Southern California, including southern Los Angeles, Long Beach, San Diego County, and Anaheim. Flash flood watches covered Los Angeles, Santa Barbara, and Ventura Counties. On January 20, an EF0 tornado was reported in Southeastern San Diego County, which lasted for 1 minute, 30 seconds. On the same day, residents in Siskiyou County in Northern California lost power for 30 hours, due to wet, heavy snow taking down power lines. Jim Rouiller, the senior energy meteorologist at Planalytics Inc., said that the storms (particularly the sixth storm) were the worst series of storms the state had experienced since 1997 (when a series of powerful storms caused the New Year's Day 1997 Northern California Flood). Rouiller expected that evening's storm to bring from 4 to 12 inches of rain, severe mudslides, a few tornadoes, and heavy mountain snow ranging from 6 to 15 feet across the Sierra Nevada mountain range.

California state water officials warned on January 21 that one week of heavy rain and snow was not enough to end the drought, which was entering its fourth year by 2010, though the precipitation from the storms had significantly reduced the severity of the drought. According to measurements on Thursday, January 21, the average water content of state's mountain ranges' snowpacks, considered the state's biggest de facto 'reservoir', was at 107% percent of normal capacity. 

On January 22, the sixth storm caused heavy rainfall in parts of Los Angeles, leading to additional flooding. 500 people were evacuated from a small village in La Paz County, Arizona due to a flash flood. Freshly-fallen snow blanketed the north side of the San Gabriel Mountains on the morning of January 23, 2010, northwest of Wrightwood, California, after the sixth storm had left. Snow was also reported in many parts of California. By the end of that week, the storms had cut the power to more than 1.3 million customers in Southern California, due to the powerful winds downing power lines. The storms also left a mess of trash and debris on the beaches of Southern California. On January 25, Mayor Liz Harris of the City of Big Bear Lake issued a state of emergency, due to the damage caused by the storm.

Elsewhere
In Yavapai County, floodwaters swept a child to his death.

The sixth storm brought snow across the Great Plains, and even as far east as parts of both Pennsylvania and New Jersey.

Overall, the storms killed at least 10 people across the United States, and caused more than $66.879 million in damages, including $3.2 million in agricultural losses.

Tornadoes

The storm systems triggered an outbreak of weak tornadoes between Santa Barbara and San Diego Counties in Southern California on January 19, which continued into January 21. EF1 damage was reported in the Huntington Beach harbor area in Orange County, and in Santa Barbara County, a local radio station reported that a sheriff's deputy had sighted a possible tornado, with roof damage near the Ocean Meadow Golf Course. A third tornado was reported by the public in Orange County, with cars overturned on the Pacific Coast Highway and roof damage in the area. Additional tornadoes and waterspouts were reported from another storm system on January 21, with damage reported in Blythe, California and Santa Barbara, California. Overall, six tornadoes were confirmed, which caused at least $3.52 million in damage.

See also

 Columbus Day Storm of 1962
 Los Angeles County flood of 2005
 January 2008 North American storm complex
 October 2009 North American storm complex
 Global storm activity of 2010
 Tornadoes of 2010
 October 2010 North American storm complex
 December 2010 North American blizzard
 November 2011 Bering Sea cyclone
 January 2013 Northwest Pacific cyclone
 March 2014 North American winter storm
 November 2014 Bering Sea cyclone
 December 2014 North American storm complex
 January 2015 North American blizzard
 2017 California floods
 El Niño
 La Niña

Notes

References

External links 

 San Diego's Stormy Week – NBC 7 San Diego
 Storms in California - NASA Earth Observatory (January 2010)
 
 

2010 meteorology
2010 natural disasters in the United States
2010 in California
2010 in Arizona
2010 in Oregon
January 2010 events in North America
Blizzards in the United States
Extratropical cyclones